Phintias was an ancient Greek vase painter; along with Euphronios and Euthymides, he was one of the most important representatives of the Pioneer Group of Athenian red-figure vase painters. Ten works from the period between 525 BC and 510 BC bearing his signature survive: seven vase paintings and three pottery works. Since his career began before the time of the Pioneer Group, his paintings look somewhat more old-fashioned than those of the other Pioneers; and the influence of earlier red-figure painters such as Psiax or Oltos is strong. Even during the Pioneer Group period he continued to use certain techniques of the black-figure style, e.g. outlines reinforced by scratching and black-figure ornamental borders. 

His paintings have been called clear, concise, and exact, but also static and somewhat stiff. Phintias' repertoire, however, is rich. He drew everyday scenes such as hetaerae, symposia and music lessons, but also mythological scenes. Like the other major members of the Pioneer group, he frequently wrote on his vases, and depicted some of his "colleagues".

References

Sources

Irma Wehgartner. Phintias [2]. In: Der Neue Pauly, Vol. 9, (2000).

6th-century BC deaths
Ancient Greek vase painters
Ancient Athenians
Year of birth unknown